The Colombian Olympic Committee or COC ( – COC) is the governing Olympic body of Colombia. Its mission is the coordination of efforts to protect the Olympic movement and consolidate its development, compliance with the rules of the Olympic Charter and promote the preparation, selection and participation of athletes in the Olympic Games and other national and international competitions.

The Colombian Olympic Committee is headquartered in Bogotá, Colombia.

History 
The Colombian Olympic Committee was created 3 July 1936 and recognized by the IOC in 1948.

List of presidents 
The following is a list of presidents of the COC:

Executive committee 
The committee of the COC is represented by:
 President: Baltazar Medina
 Vice Presidents: Jose Luis Echeverri Azcarate, Helmut Bellingrodt
 Secretary General: Ciro Solano Hurtado
 Treasurer: Rafael Lloreda Currea
 Members: Ana Edurne Camacho Corredor, Irma Lucia Ruíz Gutiérrez, Juan Luis Zapata Fuscaldo, Pedro Luis Uribe Roldan
 IOC member: Luis Alberto Moreno
 Athlete Representative: Paulo Villar
 Chief Prosecutor: Helder Navarro Carriazo
 Deputy Prosecutor: Javier Vergara Garzon
 Manager: Armando Farfan Pena

Associated federations

See also 
 Colombia at the Olympics
 Colombia at the Pan American Games
 Colombian Paralympic Committee

References

External links 
 

Colombia at the Olympics
National Olympic Committees
Olympic
1936 establishments in Colombia
Sports organizations established in 1936